Zigor Aranalde Sarasola (born 28 February 1973) is a Spanish former professional footballer who played as a left-back currently serving as assistant head coach at Premier League club Leeds United.

Playing career

Early years
Born in Ibarra, Gipuzkoa, Aranalde began his career at lowly CD Hernani, going on to spend eight of his nine professional seasons in his country in the Segunda División.

In 1996–97, he was first choice at Sevilla FC in La Liga, but the Andalusians finished third-bottom so they were relegated.

England
Aranalde joined Football League Second Division club Walsall on a two-year contract, just before the start of 2000–01. He spent just under five seasons at the Bescot Stadium, winning promotion via the play-off final in his first year and being a regular member until he was surprisingly released by manager Paul Merson, in March 2005; he moved on to Sheffield Wednesday immediately following his release, but was sent off in only his second game for the side and never appeared for them again.

In the summer of 2005, Aranalde signed for Carlisle United, who went on to win the championship and promote from League Two. He scored five goals during the campaign, and was part of a squad which included two other former Walsall players, striker Karl Hawley and future Preston North End manager Paul Simpson; on 1 October he netted Bristol Rovers' 5000th ever goal in a 1–3 loss, in his own net.

Coaching career
On 16 May 2008, it was announced that Aranalde was being released from Carlisle alongside Paul Arnison and Grant Carson. Two years later, after playing some amateur football in his country, he returned to England in April 2010 when he was named chief scout at Brighton & Hove Albion in League One. He subsequently held the same position at West Bromwich Albion, later being part of the coaching staff of Albacete Balompié.

Aranalde was named assistant manager at Premier League team Watford in January 2018, following the appointment of his compatriot Javi Gracia. Both were fired on 8 September 2019, continuing to work together at Valencia CF and Al Sadd SC.

Honours
Walsall
Division Two: 2000–01 playoff winner

Carlisle
League Two: 2005–06

References

External links

1973 births
Living people
People from Tolosaldea
Sportspeople from Gipuzkoa
Spanish footballers
Footballers from the Basque Country (autonomous community)
Association football defenders
La Liga players
Segunda División players
Segunda División B players
Tercera División players
CD Hernani players
SD Eibar footballers
CA Marbella footballers
Sevilla FC players
Albacete Balompié players
CD Logroñés footballers
UD Almansa players
English Football League players
Walsall F.C. players
Sheffield Wednesday F.C. players
Carlisle United F.C. players
Spanish expatriate footballers
Expatriate footballers in England
Spanish expatriate sportspeople in England
Watford F.C. non-playing staff
Valencia CF non-playing staff
Spanish expatriate sportspeople in Qatar